Sexykiller is a 2008 Spanish comedy horror film directed by Miguel Martí and written by Paco Cabezas. It stars Macarena Gómez as the title character.

Plot
A femme fatale fashionista at a trendy design school embarks on a brutal and bloody killing spree, while gleefully evading the hapless cops assigned to the murder cases.

Cast

Production 
The film is a Mediapro, Warner Bros. España and Antena 3 Films production. Jaume Roures and Tedy Villalba were credited as producers.

Release 
Distributed by Warner Bros. Pictures International España, the film was theatrically released in Spain on 10 October 2008.

Filmic references
The film makes a nod to many classic horror films including Taxi Driver, Friday the 13th, The Silence of the Lambs, The Evil Dead, The Texas Chain Saw Massacre and Night of the Living Dead.

See also 
 List of Spanish films of 2008

References

External links

2008 films
2000s Spanish-language films
2008 horror films
2000s crime films
Spanish horror films
2000s parody films
Spanish science fiction films
2000s comedy horror films
Zombie comedy films
Spanish thriller films
2000s mystery films
Spanish slasher films
2008 comedy films
Atresmedia Cine films
2000s Spanish films